Arsene Lupin is a lost 1917 American mystery film directed by Paul Scardon and starring Earle Williams, Brinsley Shaw and Henry Leone. It based on the character of the French gentleman thief Arsene Lupin.

Cast
 Earle Williams as Arsene Lupin 
 Brinsley Shaw as Guerchard 
 Henry Leone as Guernay-Martin 
 Bernard Siegel as Charolais 
 Gordon Gray as Anastase 
 Logan Paul as Firmin 
 Hugh Wynn as Alfred 
 Ethel Grey Terry as Sonia 
 Billie Billings as Germaine 
 Julia Swayne Gordon as Victoire 
 Frank Crayne as Child

References

Bibliography
 Backer, Ron. Mystery Movie Series of 1930s Hollywood. McFarland, 2012.

External links
 

1917 films
1917 mystery films
1910s English-language films
American silent feature films
American mystery films
American black-and-white films
Films directed by Paul Scardon
Vitagraph Studios films
1917 lost films
Lost American films
1910s American films
Silent mystery films